Robert Chrichton McBean (23 July 1892 – after 1921) was a Scottish amateur footballer who played as an outside left in the Scottish League for Queen's Park and Hamilton Academical.

Personal life 
McBean served as a corporal in the Highland Light Infantry during the First World War.

Career statistics

References

1892 births
Scottish footballers
Scottish Football League players
British Army personnel of World War I
Association football outside forwards
Queen's Park F.C. players
Highland Light Infantry soldiers
Place of death missing
Footballers from Glasgow
St Mirren F.C. wartime guest players
Linfield F.C. wartime guest players
Partick Thistle F.C. wartime guest players
Hamilton Academical F.C. players
Date of death missing
Kirkintilloch Rob Roy F.C. players
People from Gorbals